Smárason may refer to:

Örvar Þóreyjarson Smárason (born 1977), poet/author and founding member of Icelandic experimental band múm
Arnór Smárason (born 1988), Icelandic footballer
Hannes Smárason (born 1967), Icelandic businessman and former CEO of FL Group